X Corps is a corps of the Indian Army. It is based in Bathinda and is a part of South Western Command.

The X (Chetak) Corps was raised at Bathinda on 1 July 1979 by Lieutenant General ML Tuli, to reduce the load of XI Corps. The new corps took over south Punjab and north Rajasthan.

Organisation

The corps has two of the army's Reorganised Army Plains Infantry Divisions (RAPIDs).

It consists of:
16 Infantry Division (Amogh Division) headquartered at Sri Ganganagar, Rajasthan
18 Infantry Division (RAPID) (Gandiv Division) at Kota, Rajasthan
24 Infantry Division (RAPID) (Ranbankura Division) at Bikaner, Rajasthan. In 2001, 24th Artillery Brigade and 180th Armoured Brigade were at Bikaner, 25th Infantry Brigade was at Bathinda, Punjab and 83rd Infantry Brigade was at Lalgarh Jattan. 
6 (Independent) Armoured Brigade (Sand Viper Brigade) at Suratgarh, Rajasthan
615 (Independent) Air Defence Brigade (2 Battalions of Shilka and Tunguska and 1 Battalion of SA-6 and SA-13).

Formation Sign
At the time of re-raising, 10 corps adopted the present divisional formation sign. The formation sign was designed by its first General Officer Commanding (GOC) - Lieutenant General ML Tuli. The design consists of the 'red-white-red background' depicting a corps of the Indian Army and a horse with the torso of a man.

Chetak, traditionally the horse ridden by Maharana Pratap at the Battle of Haldighati is associated with Rajput chivalry and is symbolic of mobility and manoeuvre. Th horse is poised in a bid to spring into action, which symbolises optimum readiness. The torso of a soldier is depicted in a power packed stance launching a spear at the enemy - which symbolises instant alertness for aggressive action to face any challenge.

List of Commanders

References 

010
Military units and formations established in 1976